The Name of Love is a song written by Lina Eriksson and Mårten Eriksson, and performed by Magnus Bäcklund at the Swedish Melodifestivalen 2006. Reaching the finals through Andra chansen, the song ended up 5th with 68 points, where 11 came from the telephone voters.

Single 
At the Swedish singles chart, it peaked at 6th position. The song also reached Svensktoppen where it stayed for one week, a 9th position on 14 May 2006 before leaving the chart.

Single track listing
The Name of Love (original version) - 3:06
The Name of Love (singback version) - 3:03

Charts

References

2006 singles
2006 songs
English-language Swedish songs
Swedish songs
Melodifestivalen songs of 2006
Songs written by Lina Eriksson
Songs written by Mårten Eriksson